Slalok Mountain, originally known as Rex's Pillar, is a  mountain summit located in the Coast Mountains, in Joffre Lakes Provincial Park, in southwestern British Columbia, Canada. It is the third-highest point of the Joffre Group, which is a subset of the Lillooet Ranges. Precipitation runoff from the peak drains into Joffre Creek and Twin One Creek, both tributaries of the Lillooet River. The first ascent of the mountain was made in 1963 by C. Adam, T. Anderson, and G. Richardson. The mountain's name Slalok is the traditional name for the settlement of nearby Mount Currie. The name was officially adopted on June 11, 1979, by the Geographical Names Board of Canada. The mountain and its climate supports the Matier Glacier, Stonecrop Glacier, and Tszil Glacier on the northern slopes.

Climate

Based on the Köppen climate classification, Slalok Mountain is located in a subarctic climate zone of western North America. Most weather fronts originate in the Pacific Ocean, and travel east toward the Coast Mountains where they are forced upward by the range (Orographic lift), causing them to drop their moisture in the form of rain or snowfall. As a result, the Coast Mountains experience high precipitation, especially during the winter months in the form of snowfall. Temperatures can drop below −20 °C with wind chill factors below −30 °C. The months July through September offer the most favorable weather for climbing Slalok Mountain.

Climbing Routes
Established climbing routes on Slalok Mountain:
   
 Southwest Ridge -  
 Matier Glacier - Ski ascent 
 Northeast Ridge  
 North Face (Stonecrop Glacier)

Gallery

See also

 Geography of British Columbia
 Geology of British Columbia

References

External links
 Weather forecast: Slalok Mountain
 Climbing Slalok Mountain: YouTube

Two-thousanders of British Columbia
Lillooet Ranges